Juan Mónaco and Rafael Nadal were the defending champions, but Mónaco could not participate due to an injury. Nadal played alongside Fernando Verdasco, but lost in the first round to Teymuraz Gabashvili and Albert Ramos-Viñolas.
Feliciano López and Marc López won the title, defeating Philipp Petzschner and Alexander Peya in the final, 6–4, 6–3.

Seeds

Draw

Draw

References
 Main Draw

Doubles